Bat SARS-like coronavirus WIV1 (Bat SL-CoV-WIV1), also sometimes called SARS-like coronavirus WIV1, is a strain of severe acute respiratory syndrome–related coronavirus (SARSr-CoV) isolated from Chinese rufous horseshoe bats in 2013 (Rhinolophus sinicus). Like all coronaviruses, virions consist of single-stranded positive-sense RNA enclosed within an envelope.

Zoonosis

The discovery confirms that bats are the natural reservoir of SARS-CoV. Phylogenetic analysis shows the possibility of direct transmission of SARS from bats to humans without the intermediary Chinese civets, as previously believed.

Phylogenetic

See also
 Bat as food
 Bat coronavirus RaTG13
 Bat virome
 SARS-CoV-2
 Wuhan Institute of Virology (WIV)

References

Animal virology
SARS-related coronavirus
Zoonoses
Bat virome
Infraspecific virus taxa